Frosted glass may refer to:
 Frosted glass, type of glass
 Frosted glass (band), metal band from Saint Petersburg, Russia